Glasgow Seaplane Terminal is a seaplane airport terminal in Glasgow, Scotland. It opened in August 2007.

The terminal is located in the 'Princes Dock' adjacent Glasgow Science Centre in the Pacific Quay area of the city.  The city also has two international airports, Glasgow Airport and Glasgow Prestwick Airport, although both are located outside the city.

The terminal maiden scheduled service from Glasgow to Oban began in August 2007.  It is currently Europe's only city centre commercial seaplane service in operation.

History 
The terminal was opened by Loch Lomond Seaplanes, in August 2007, to allow the first commercial seaplane service in nearly 50 years to start from the city centre, initially from Glasgow to Oban, flying from the River Clyde Pacific Quay area.  A service to Tobermory on the Isle of Mull operated in 2008.

Loch Lomond Seaplanes offer charter services from the terminal – future plans include scheduled services. These would include Arran, Bute, and potentially intercity services between Glasgow and Edinburgh.

Services 
 Loch Lomond Seaplanes (Oban, Tobermory).

References

External links 
 Loch Lomond Seaplanes
 River Clyde Seaplane service – Clyde Waterfront

Airports in Scotland
Buildings and structures in Glasgow
Seaplane bases in the United Kingdom
Seaplane bases in Scotland
Transport in Glasgow
Airports established in 2007
2007 establishments in Scotland